Nelson Heg Wei Keat (born 6 January 1993) is a Malaysian badminton player. He won gold medals at the 2011 World Junior Championships in the team and boys' doubles events.

Achievements

BWF World Junior Championships 
Boys' doubles

Mixed doubles

Asian Junior Championships 
Boys' doubles

BWF International Challenge/Series (2 titles, 1 runners-up) 
Men's doubles

Mixed doubles

  BWF International Challenge tournament
  BWF International Series tournament
  BWF Future Series tournament

References

External links 
 

1993 births
Living people
Malaysian sportspeople of Chinese descent
Malaysian male badminton players
21st-century Malaysian people